The fifteenth season of the American animated sitcom South Park was picked up on January 10, 2011 and began airing on Comedy Central on April 27, 2011 and ended on November 16, 2011. In response to reactions to the mid-season finale episode "You're Getting Old", which seemed to insinuate that creators Trey Parker and Matt Stone were wrapping up the series, Comedy Central proclaimed through the media that South Park was renewed for two more seasons, and the duo were signed through 2013. Shortly before the airing of the season finale episode "The Poor Kid", South Park was extended again until 2016, taking the show to 20 seasons. Parker was the director and writer for all episodes, and Robert Lopez was the writer in this eleventh episode for the fifteenth season.

Episodes

References

External links
 South Park Studios – official website with streaming video of full episodes.

 
2011 American television seasons